H2O is a Canadian political drama two-part miniseries that first aired on the CBC Television October 31, 2004. It starred Paul Gross and Leslie Hope, with then-politician Belinda Stronach making a cameo appearance. Written by Gross and John Krizanc and directed by Charles Binamé, it was nominated for five Gemini Awards and four DGC Craft Awards. It won one Golden Nymph Award for best actor (Paul Gross).

Plot

In the midst of negotiations with the United States Secretary of State, the Prime Minister of Canada dies in a canoeing accident. His son Tom McLaughlin (Paul Gross) returns from overseas to deliver the eulogy at his father's state funeral. The attention it receives propels him into politics and he ultimately becomes prime minister. The investigation into his father's death, however, reveals that it was no accident and raises the possibility of assassination. McLaughlin accepts the U.S. President's plan to develop the Great Recycling and Northern Development Canal to help the United States with its water shortage. Sgt. Leah Collins (Leslie Hope) and Member of Parliament Marc Lavigne (Guy Nadon) slowly piece together evidence of a conspiracy that threatens Canada's existence.

Cast

Location
Filming took place all over the city of Ottawa. Some of the bigger locations included Earnscliffe and the Parliament Buildings of Canada.

Sequel
The Trojan Horse, featuring McLaughlin's continuing political ambitions and struggles in the wake of the events of H2O, premiered on CBC on Sunday, 30 March 2008.

References

External links
 
 CBC Television Official site
 CBC Television official site for the sequel mini-series, The Trojan Horse
 H2O picture gallery

2000s Canadian television miniseries
2004 television films
2004 films
Television shows set in Ottawa
Canada–United States relations in popular culture
CBC Television original programming
Canadian political drama television series
Television series about prime ministers
2000s English-language films